The VL85 is a Soviet (and later Russian) built electric mainline freight locomotive manufactured at the Novocherkassk Electric Locomotive Plant (NEVZ) and designed under the management of V.Ya.Sverdlov (ru:В.Я.Свердлов).

History
Designed by the Vsesoyuzny nauchno-issledovatel'ski i proektno-konstruktorski institut elektrovozostroeniya (en: USSR national scientific research and design-engineering institute of electric locomotive construction) – the VL85 was at the time of its introduction the most powerful production locomotive in the world. The first prototypes were built in 1983 and were tested on the experimental ring at the All-Russian Research Institute of Railway Transport (VNIIZhT). Further testing was performed on the North-Caucasian Railway. Full production began in 1985 and continued until 1994. A total of 270 units were built. All VL85 locomotives operate on the East-Siberian Railway and the Krasnoyarsk Railway, from depots at Ilanskaya, Taishet, Nizhneudinsk, and Ulan-Ude.

Technical characteristics
The VL85 operates on single-phase alternating current.

Traction and braking forces are transmitted to the body via inclined rods. The end bogies on each unit have a cradle suspension, while the central Jacobs bogie has a set of swinging compressed elastic rods to allow for lateral movement through curves.

To provide current collection there is a pantograph above each cab. Each unit has a 7,100 kVA traction transformer, model ONDTSE-10000/25-82UHL2. Each transformer has a high voltage winding and three traction windings. Each section also has three VIP-4000 rectifiers. Each is powered by its own traction winding and provides power to two parallel connected traction motors on a bogie. These rectifiers use thyristor control and also convert power back to alternating current during regenerative braking.

The first two prototypes used the same NB-418K6 traction motors as the VL80 series. Production units use the NB-514 model. Improvements in the aerodynamics of the ventilation ducts reduced the number of cooling fans for this motor by half.

A new feature of the cab is a single large control panel in the centre, replacing separate panels for the driver and assistant. In service these locomotives are nicknamed 'Ox' because of their size. Despite the theoretically greater adhesion that should be provided by the new suspension system (the point of transfer is below the axles) these units are noted as being slightly less 'grippy' than their VL80R predecessor, possibly due to difficulty in attaining perfect weight distribution across the three bogies.

References

Electric locomotives of Russia
Electric locomotives of the Soviet Union
25 kV AC locomotives
Railway locomotives introduced in 1983
5 ft gauge locomotives

Bo′Bo′Bo′ locomotives
Bo-Bo-Bo locomotives